Chorlton High School is a coeducational secondary school with academy status, located in Chorlton-cum-Hardy, Manchester, England. It has around 1500 pupils and 300 in each year.

History

Grammar school
There was a "Chorlton High School" in the 19th century run by Dr William Ballantyne Hodgson, this Chorlton High School (for Boys) was founded in September 1924 with 110 boys due to the growing need to educate older local boys. The first headmaster was A. F. Chappell, appointed in 1925. During Second World War it was twice evacuated to Fleetwood, owing to the Blitz; school records for the period during the war are sketchy, as the boys were moved around multiple times. The first headmaster retired in 1951 and was succeeded by Mr Merriman a year later. In 1952 it became a grammar school as pupil numbers started increasing again. The third and final headmaster was C. A. Crofts, appointed in 1963. There was at one time a lower school in Darley Avenue (formerly Barlow Hall School).

Comprehensive
During the 1960s it returned to its comprehensive roots. The existing building of Chorlton High School at Nell Lane (built in the early 1960s) co-existed with the Grammar School for a number of years. At this At this point the present Chorlton High did not replace the two combined schools but existed alongside it. The Sandy Lane/Corkland Road site was closed and the buildings demolished some years later.  In the early years it was called Oakwood High School. Chorlton Grammar School on Corkland Road merged with Barlow Hall Secondary Modern School in 1967, when all of Manchester's secondary state schools became comprehensive. Oakwood High School was the name give to the school, formed by the amalgamation of Wilbraham High School and Chorlton High School in the early 1980s. The current site of Chorlton High School at Nell Lane, was the original site of the Wilbraham High School Upper School.

It was designated a specialist Arts College in 2002. In May 2012, the school governors approved the controversial decision to convert into an academy. The school became an academy on 1 January 2013.

Notable people 
A recording studio commemorates Maurice Gibb, though none of the Bee Gees studied at Chorlton High School. They went to the nearby Oswald Road primary school but the family then emigrated to Australia.

Chorlton High School 
 Trevor Davey, Member of Parliament (New Zealand)

Oakwood High School
 Andrea Ashworth, author of the memoir, Once in a House on Fire. 
Danielle Jawando, author and screenwriter. 
David Joseph Henry, Writer and human rights activist.
David Judge, Actor, playwright and performance poet.
 Jason Manford, Comedian, television and radio presenter.

Wilbraham High School 

 David Threlfall, English stage, film and television actor and director. Frank Gallagher (Shameless).

Didsbury Technical High School
 Jim Cumbes, cricketer and goalkeeper for Aston Villa
 Paul Hart, defender for Leeds United
 Keith Newton, defender for Blackburn Rovers and Burnley
 Sir Michael Turner CBE FRAeS, Chief Executive from 2002 to 2008 of BAE Systems, and chairman since 2008 of Babcock International and from 2012 of GKN

Chorlton Grammar School
 Peter Barnes, Footballer and Sports Pundit.
 Frank Cohen
Trevor Davey (1926–2012), member of the New Zealand House of Representatives (–1975)
 Jack Eccles  CBE, President of the Trades Union Congress (1985–1986)
 Roy Gibson, Director General from 1985 to 1987 of the British National Space Centre, and Director General from 1975 to 1980 of the European Space Agency (ESA)
 John Gwynne, darts commentator, father of Andrew Gwynne, the Labour MP for Denton and Reddish since 2005
 Harry Hargreaves, was an English cartoonist
 Graham Paddon, midfielder for Norwich City
 Hannah Elizabeth Pipe, (1831–1906), headteacher

Former staff 
Adrian Henri – taught at the school during the 1950s.

References

External links 
School website
Chorlton Grammar School Old Boys (Unofficial alumni website)

Defunct grammar schools in England
Secondary schools in Manchester
Academies in Manchester
1924 establishments in England
Educational institutions established in 1924